As of 2016, there were over 160 operational wind farms in Lithuania, but the majority of them consisted of small farms generating less than 2 MW.

Wind farms 
Only farms with bigger than 3 MW capacity are listed.

See also

Energy in Lithuania

References

Lithuanai
Wind power in Lithuania